The rivière aux Bluets (in English: Blueberries River) is a tributary of Grand lac Saint François which constitutes the head lake of the Saint-François River. The course of the "Rivière aux Bluets" crosses the territory of the municipalities of Saint-Hilaire-de-Dorset, Courcelles and Lambton, in the Le Granit Regional County Municipality, in the administrative region of Estrie, on the South Shore of the St. Lawrence River, in Quebec, Canada.

Geography 

The main hydrographic slopes near the "Rivière aux Bluets" are:
 north side: Petite rivière Muskrat, Hamel River;
 east side: rivière Grande Coudée, Petite rivière du Portage;
 south side: Ludgine River, Madisson River, Grand lac Saint François;
 west side: Muskrat river, rivière de l'Or.
The "Rivière aux Bluets" has its source in a mountainous area in the seventh rang, south of the village of Saint-Hilaire-de-Dorset, north-east of the village of Saint-Sébastien, north-west of Saint-Ludger, west of rivière de la Grande Coudée and north of Drolet Lake. This area is located in the municipality of Saint-Hilaire-de-Dorset in the Beauce-Sartigan Regional County Municipality).

The mouth of the "rivière aux Bluets" empties at the end of a bay which constitutes an extension of the northeast shore of Grand lac Saint François.

Toponymy 

The toponym "Rivière aux Bluets" was officially registered on December 5, 1968, at the Commission de toponymie du Québec.

See also 

 Frontenac National Park
 List of rivers of Quebec

References 

Le Granit Regional County Municipality
Rivers of Estrie